Sir Joseph Beecham, 1st Baronet (8 June 1848 – 23 October 1916) was a British businessman.

Beecham was the eldest son of Thomas Beecham and Jane Evans. He played a large part in the growth and expansion of his father's medicinal pill business which he joined in 1866. He was responsible for Beechams' factory and office in Westfield Street, St. Helens, being built in 1885. A factory was subsequently opened in New York followed by more factories and agencies in several other countries. The increasing demands placed on him by his father's business meant he had to step down from his position as the parish organist of St John the Evangelist, Ravenhead. 

Beecham was the proprietor of the Aldwych Theatre in London, a justice of the peace for Lancashire and was mayor of St. Helens between 1889 and 1899 and again from 1910 to 1912. He was made a baronet, of Ewanville in the Parish of Huyton in the County Palatine of Lancaster, in 1914. He was invested as a Knight of the Order of Saint Stanislaus by Tsar Nicholas II. Beecham was a patron of the arts and purchased a number of paintings by J. M. W. Turner. Beecham married Josephine Burnett in 1873.

Death
Sir Joseph Beecham died on 23 October 1916, aged 68. He was succeeded in the baronetcy by his eldest son, Thomas, who had been knighted in his own right earlier in 1916 for his services to music as an orchestral conductor.

References

Bibliography

Businesspeople in the pharmaceutical industry
Baronets in the Baronetage of the United Kingdom
1848 births
1916 deaths
Mayors of places in Merseyside
English justices of the peace
19th-century English businesspeople